Starobalbukovo (Balbuq) is a rural locality (a village) in Tungatarovsky Selsoviet, Uchalinsky District, Bashkortostan, Russia. The population was 166 as of 2010. There are 2 streets.

Geography 
Starobalbukovo is located 50 km northeast of Uchaly (the district's administrative centre) by road. Polyakovka is the nearest rural locality.

References 

Rural localities in Uchalinsky District